Pamukunta is a village in Nalgonda district, in Telangana State, India.

Transport
Pamukunta village is situated on Pamukunta Road with connections to nearby towns and cities with regular buses and other modes of transportation.

References

Villages in Yadadri Bhuvanagiri district